The 2016 Bojangles' Southern 500, the 67th running of the event, was a NASCAR Sprint Cup Series stock car race that was held on September 4, 2016 at Darlington Raceway in Darlington, South Carolina. Contested over 367 laps on the  egg-shaped oval, it was the 25th race of the 2016 NASCAR Sprint Cup Series season. Furniture Row Racing's Martin Truex Jr. won the race by holding off Kevin Harvick to earn his second victory of the 2016 season.

Brad Keselowski made his way to a second-place finish, The race had eight lead changes among different drivers and ten cautions for 52 laps.

Report

Background

Darlington Raceway is a race track built for NASCAR racing located near Darlington, South Carolina. It is nicknamed "The Lady in Black" and "The Track Too Tough to Tame" by many NASCAR fans and drivers and advertised as "A NASCAR Tradition." It is of a unique, somewhat egg-shaped design, an oval with the ends of very different configurations, a condition which supposedly arose from the proximity of one end of the track to a minnow pond the owner refused to relocate. This situation makes it very challenging for the crews to set up their cars' handling in a way that will be effective at both ends.

Entry list
The preliminary entry list for the race included 40 cars and was released on August 27, 2016 at 1:52 p.m. Eastern time.

Qualifying
NASCAR cancelled all Friday activities and rescheduled both practice sessions in place of qualifying for Saturday due to rain from Hurricane Hermine. Kevin Harvick was awarded the pole position as a result.

Starting lineup

Practice

First practice

Final practice

Race

First half

Under mostly sunny South Carolina skies, Kevin Harvick led the field to the green flag at 6:26 p.m. Not much happened during this first run of the race outside of Clint Bowyer making an unscheduled stop for a flat tire on lap 23. Kyle Larson started a cycle of green flag stops on lap 47. Harvick retained the lead through the pit cycle. Austin Dillon and Michael McDowell were black-flagged for speeding and forced to serve a pass through penalty.

It was the same routine the next run of riding around the track until the second round of stops on lap 92. This time, Brad Keselowski assumed the lead when Harvick pitted. Trevor Bayne spun out at the entrance of pit road and brought out the first caution of the race on lap 96. This trapped all but Keselowski, Chase Elliott and Ricky Stenhouse Jr. a lap or more down. Everyone opted to take the wave-around when the top-three pitted.

The race restarted on lap 103. Jimmie Johnson, who was black-flagged before the caution flew for "illegal body modification," was forced to serve a pass through penalty. The second caution of the race flew on lap 114 after Brian Scott got loose exiting turn 2 and spun out.

The race restarted on lap 118. Keselowski drove away from the field for a time, but was chased down by Harvick who passed him in turn 2 to retake the lead on lap 141. A number of cars started pitting on lap 162. Harvick was among them and Keselowski assumed the lead. He pitted the next lap and the lead cycled back to Harvick.

The third caution of the race flew on lap 204 for a single-car wreck on the backstretch. Exiting turn 2, Tony Stewart got alongside Scott and his car got loose. After he recovered his car, he veered back to the right, hooked Scott and sent him into the inside wall. "We were just in a bad situation ... I was trying to let Tony go," Scott said. "Apparently he got mad at me. I have a lot of respect for Tony. He's always raced me really clean. I am not sure what he thought was going on there. I am not sure if he thought I was trying to hold him up there, I wasn’t. I was trying to let him go. I even pointed him to the inside. Maybe he thought I was giving him the finger or something. I will talk with him. We will figure it out.” Stewart was called to the NASCAR hauler after the race for the incident. He denied intentionally wrecking him, saying afterwards that he was "on old tires and sliding around. I got underneath him in [Turn] 2 and for some reason, he ran us through there [beside us] and I got really loose, and I was still getting it gathered up and got him in the left rear and wrecked him."

Second half
The race restarted on lap 211. The fourth caution of the race flew on lap 213 after Johnson got loose exiting turn 4, spun down the track and hit the inside wall on the frontstretch.

The race restarted on lap 218. The fifth caution of the race flew on lap 249 after Jeffrey Earnhardt slammed the wall in turn 4. Denny Hamlin exited pit road with the race lead.

The race restarted on lap 255. The sixth caution of the race flew on lap 260 for Greg Biffle hitting the wall in turn 4. Matt Kenseth opted not to pit under the caution and assumed the race lead.

The race restarted on lap 265. Harvick drove by Kenseth to retake the lead with 94 laps to go. The seventh caution of the race flew with 87 laps to go for a two-car wreck in turn 2 involving A. J. Allmendinger and Ryan Blaney. Hamlin exited pit road with the race lead.

The race restarted with 83 laps to go. Larson got a great restart and took the lead from Hamlin with 82 laps to go. Oil left on the track that came from the expired engine of Stewart's No. 14 car brought out the eighth caution of the race with 48 laps to go.

The race restarted with 45 laps to go. The ninth caution of the race flew with 39 laps to go for a two-car wreck on the backstretch. Rounding turn 2, Paul Menard suffered a left-rear tire blowout, got loose, clipped Kurt Busch and sent him backwards into the wall. He continued down the track hitting the inside wall head on. Ryan Newman opted not to pit and assumed the lead along with Brad Keselowski who also stayed out.

The race restarted with 34 laps to go. Martin Truex Jr. passed Newman for the lead with 27 laps to go. Harvick reeled him in to take the lead just as the 10th caution of the race flew for a two-car wreck in turn 2 involving Aric Almirola and Bowyer. Truex exited pit road with the race lead.

The race restarted with 12 laps to go. Truex drove on to score the victory.

Post-race

Driver comment
Truex said in victory lane that the win was "just – this is unbelievable. So many people to thank obviously. I’ve always loved this race track. I’ve led a lot of laps here in my career. I feel like just something always happened and just so proud to get to victory lane with this group. The pit crew was flawless tonight. They won us the race. They took a lot of heat from last week with what happened. I'm glad he's (Ryan Newman) not riding home with me – he'd be waiting a while. But just a big weekend for us to – we’ve had a terrible string of back luck. We’ve had super-fast race cars. Auto-Owners Insurance, this is their second race with us and one more with us this year and really excited for them. They went a little retro. I’ve got my zoot suit. This is something here that's really special to us – I ran this wheel today and it's real special to take that thing to victory lane. We do a lot with our foundation for ovarian and pediatric cancer. It's awareness month for both of those diseases, so big day for us there, but just can't say enough about this team and Barney Visser (team owner) and Toyota and TRD (Toyota Racing Development) – the engines have been unbelievable this year – and Bass Pro Shops and Furniture Row, Denver Mattress and everybody that's made this possible. Cole Pearn (crew chief) and these guys are just amazing. I knew when the bad luck would stop coming we'd start racking them off. We do a lot with our foundation for ovarian and pediatric cancer. It's awareness month for both of those diseases, so big day for us there, but just can't say enough about this team and Barney Visser (team owner) and Toyota and TRD (Toyota Racing Development) – the engines have been unbelievable this year – and Bass Pro Shops and Furniture Row, Denver Mattress and everybody that's made this possible. Cole Pearn (crew chief) and these guys are just amazing. I knew when the bad luck would stop coming we'd start racking them off and tonight we weren't the best car for once and we actually won, so that was really cool and just couldn't be more excited to win at Darlington, the Southern 500. I’ve been wanting to win this thing a long time and got to thank Sprint, the fans were great – tons of fans here today – and really excited. Glad they stuck around for a good finish and I don't know – I could go on and on for hours I guess. Well, it just was frustrating to lead laps here throughout my career and even in years when we didn't run that well at teams I was on, we seemed to run well here and felt like we let a few slip away. It was worth the wait for sure, so we'll do some celebrating tonight and just can't thank everybody enough again – everybody at (Joe) Gibbs (Racing), all those guys, great teammates – just so many people I need to thank. The pit crew – man, I can't say it enough, what a job they did tonight. I appreciate them.”

After a series of bad pit stops relegated Harvick, who led a race high of 214 laps, to a runner-up finish, he said that he lost the race because of "the same old thing. You get into position where you bring a dominant car. The guys in the shop and the guys in the garage are doing a great job. The guys on pit road are doing a terrible job. You get into position to win races and they continually step on their toes and don’t make it happen.’’ During his post-race media availability, he went further saying he's "over being a cheerleader. Those guys get paid a lot of money to perform on pit road and cheerleading hasn't really been working. You've got to get after it on pit road and do your job.”

Penalties
On the Wednesday following the race, Larson and Newman – whose cars failed post-race inspection – were docked 15 points each, and their crew chiefs were both fined over $20,000.

Race results

Race summary
 Lead changes: 8 among different drivers
 Cautions/Laps: 10 for 52
 Red flags: 0
 Time of race: 3 hours, 57 minutes and 54 seconds
 Average speed:

Media

Television
NBC Sports covered the race on the television side. Rick Allen, two–time Darlington winner Jeff Burton and Steve Letarte had the call in the booth for the race. As part of the throwback weekend, Ken Squier, Ned Jarrett and Dale Jarrett also called a portion of the race. Dave Burns, Mike Massaro, Marty Snider and Kelli Stavast handled pit road on the television side.

Radio
The Motor Racing Network had the radio call for the race, which was simulcasted on Sirius XM NASCAR Radio. Dave Moody called the race from a Billboard outside of turn when the field raced through turns 1 and 2, and Mike Bagley had the call of the race atop of the Darlington Raceway Club outside of turn 3 when the field raced through turns 3 and 4

Standings after the race

Note: Only the first 16 positions are included for the driver standings.. – Driver has clinched a position in the Chase for the Sprint Cup.

References

Bojangles' Southern 500
Bojangles' Southern 500
Historically themed events
NASCAR races at Darlington Raceway
Bojangles' Southern 500